The 1999 Cheltenham Gold Cup was a horse race which took place at Cheltenham on Thursday March 18, 1999. It was the 72nd running of the Cheltenham Gold Cup, and it was won by See More Business. The winner was ridden by Mick Fitzgerald and trained by Paul Nicholls. The pre-race favourite Florida Pearl finished third.

The jockey-trainer partnership of Fitzgerald and Nicholls completed a big-race double, as they had also won the previous day's Queen Mother Champion Chase with Call Equiname.

Race details
 Sponsor: Tote
 Winner's prize money: £149,600.00
 Going: Good to Soft
 Number of runners: 12
 Winner's time: 6m 41.9s

Full result

* The distances between the horses are shown in lengths or shorter. nk = neck; PU = pulled-up.† Trainers are based in Great Britain unless indicated.

Winner's details
Further details of the winner, See More Business:

 Foaled: April 26, 1990, in Ireland
 Sire: Seymour Hicks; Dam: Miss Redlands (Dubassoff)
 Owner: Paul Barber and John Keighley
 Breeder: Ian Bryant

References
 
 sportinglife.com
 bbc.co.uk – "See More Business wins Gold Cup" – March 18, 1999.

Cheltenham Gold Cup
 1999
Cheltenham Gold Cup
Cheltenham Gold Cup
1990s in Gloucestershire